Ruminiclostridium cellulolyticum is an anaerobic, motile, gram-positive bacterium. It is the most cellulolytic bacteria.

References

External links
 Type strain of Clostridium cellulolyticum at BacDive -  the Bacterial Diversity Metadatabase

Gram-positive bacteria
Bacteria described in 1984
Oscillospiraceae